Keith Newell (born January 10, 1988) is an American football offensive lineman who is currently a free agent. He played college football at Delaware State University.

College career
Newell played for the Rutgers Scarlet Knights from 2007 to 2008. He never appeared in a game for the Scarlet Knights. In 2009, he transferred to Delaware State where he would play from 2009 to 2011. He was the team's starter his final two years and helped the Hornets to 6 wins. He played in 21 games during his career including 21 starts at tackle.

Professional career

Trenton Freedom
Newell signed with the Trenton Freedom of the Professional Indoor Football League. Newell was placed on the exempt list before the season began.

Pittsburgh Power
On March 7, 2014, Newell was assigned to the Pittsburgh Power. Newell played in 14 games, starting 10 as the Power finished a franchise best 15–3. Newell had his rookie option picked up on September 24, 2014.

Philadelphia Soul
On December 29, 2014, Newell was assigned to the Philadelphia Soul. Newell helped the Soul reach and win ArenaBowl XXIX. On August 26, 2017, the Soul beat the Tampa Bay Storm in ArenaBowl XXX by a score of 44–40.

FXFL Blacktips
Newell played with the FXFL Blacktips of the Fall Experimental Football League during their 2015 season.

References

External links
Delaware State Hornets profile

Living people
1988 births
Players of American football from Trenton, New Jersey
American football offensive linemen
Delaware State Hornets football players
Trenton Freedom players
Pittsburgh Power players
Blacktips (FXFL) players
Philadelphia Soul players
Trenton Central High School alumni
African-American players of American football
21st-century African-American sportspeople
20th-century African-American people